Cidade do Samba (Portuguese, Samba City), formally known as Cidade do Samba Joãozinho Trinta, is a complex of buildings in the neighborhood of Gamboa, Rio de Janeiro, Brazil. It is used for Samba schools to prepare for carnival. About fourteen of the major samba schools have a warehouse in the complex.

February 2011 fire
On the early morning of Monday February 7, 2011, four weeks before carnival, a fire broke out in the buildings. The warehouses contain many costumes and floats, often composed with inflammable materials. Some 8400 costumes and twenty floats, belonging to three samba schools, might be lost

Cidade do Samba Joãozinho Trinta 2024

References

See also
 Site of Cidade do Samba (pt)

Samba city
Samba city